Mathesiusite is a sulfate mineral containing potassium, vanadium, and uranium and has the chemical formula: K5(UO2)4(SO4)4(VO5)·4(H2O). It is a secondary mineral formed during post-mining processes.

It was discovered in the Jáchymov mining district, Czech Republic and named in 2013 after Johannes Mathesius (1504–1565), who studied minerals from the area (known then as Joachimsthal, Bohemia).

References

Uranium minerals
Sulfate minerals
Vanadium minerals
Potassium minerals
Tetragonal minerals
Minerals in space group 85